Errors of Youth (Oshibki yunosti) is a Soviet drama film directed in 1978 by Boris Frumin. It was screened in the Un Certain Regard section at the 1989 Cannes Film Festival. The "critical realism" is reported to have delayed the release; Frumin left the Soviet Union in 1979 and was in 1988 invited back to complete it.

Plot
The film recounts the restless life of Dmitri Guryanov after he completes his military service.

Cast
 Nina Arkhipova
 Nikolai Karachentsov
 Marina Neyolova - Polina
 Nikolai Penkov
 Natalya Varley - Zina
 Mikhail Vaskov - Burkov
 Stanislav Zhdanko - Dimitri Gurianov

References

External links

1978 films
1978 drama films
Soviet drama films
Russian drama films
1970s Russian-language films
Films directed by Boris Frumin